Victory and Peace is a 1918 British silent war film directed by Herbert Brenon and starring Matheson Lang, Marie Lohr, and James Carew. The film was produced by the National War Aims Committee that was set up in 1917 to focus on domestic propaganda during the First World War. The novelist Hall Caine was recruited for the committee by the Prime Minister David Lloyd George to write the screenplay. Lloyd George chose Caine due to his experience in the field of cinema and his "reputation as a man of letters". The film was designed to show what would happen in a German invasion. It was mostly shot in Chester with some scenes filmed at Chirk Castle. Most of the negative of the newly finished film was destroyed in a fire at the offices of the London Film Company in June 1918. It was re-filmed over four months, just as the war ended, and so never went on general release. It is a partially lost film, with only around 1,000 feet of film still surviving. Edward Elgar was to have composed the score. Originally entitled The National Film, its alternative title is The Invasion of Britain.

Cast
 Matheson Lang as Edward Arkwright
 Marie Lohr as Barbara Rowntree
 James Carew as Karl Hoffman
 Ellen Terry as Widow Weaver
 Renée Mayer as Jenny Banks
 Hayford Hobbs as Charlie Caine
 Frederick Kerr as Sir Richard Arkwright
 Jose Collins as Madge Brierley
 Sam Livesey as Capt. Schiff
 Edith Craig as Mary Rountree
 Bertram Wallis as Bob Brierley
 Ben Greet as Mayor of Castleton
 Harding Thomas as Jim Banks
 Arthur Applin as Capt. von Lindheimer
 Henry Vibart as Bishop
 Sydney Lewis Ransome as Rev. Paul Brayton
 Joyce Templeton as Joyce Brierley
 Helena Millais as Liz Lowery
 Rolf Leslie as Abraham Lincoln

See also
Invasion literature

References

Bibliography
 Allen, Vivien. Hall Caine: Portrait of a Victorian Romancer. Continuum, 1997.
 Low, Rachael. History of the British Film, 1914-1918. Routledge, 2005.

External links

Watch Victory and Peace online British Film Institute 
Articles on Victory and Peace National Library of Australia

1918 films
1918 war films
British war films
1910s English-language films
Films directed by Herbert Brenon
British silent feature films
British black-and-white films
Silent war films
1910s British films